Pablo Andrade Plaza da Silva (born 15 February 1994) is a Brazilian professional footballer who plays for Finnish club SJK, as a defender.

References

1994 births
Living people
Ourense CF players
Seinäjoen Jalkapallokerho players
Veikkausliiga players
Association football defenders
Footballers from Rio de Janeiro (city)
Brazilian footballers
Brazilian expatriate footballers
Brazilian expatriate sportspeople in Spain
Expatriate footballers in Spain
Brazilian expatriate sportspeople in Finland
Expatriate footballers in Finland